Trechus shushensis is a species of ground beetle in the subfamily Trechinae. It was described by Belousov & Kabak in 1994.

References

shushensis
Beetles described in 1994